A sin tax is an excise tax specifically levied on certain goods deemed harmful to society and individuals, such as alcohol, tobacco, drugs, candies, soft drinks, fast foods, coffee, sugar, gambling, and pornography. In contrast to Pigovian taxes, which are to pay for the damage to society caused by these goods, sin taxes are used to increase the price in an effort to lower demand, or failing that, to increase and find new sources of revenue. Increasing a sin tax is often more popular than increasing other taxes. However, these taxes have often been criticized for burdening the poor and taxing the physically and mentally dependent.

Summary
The enactment of sin taxes on harmful activities varies by jurisdiction. In many cases, sumptuary taxes are implemented to mitigate use of alcohol and tobacco, gambling, and vehicles emitting excessive pollutants. Sumptuary tax on sugar and soft drinks has also been suggested. Some jurisdictions have also levied taxes on recreational drugs such as marijuana.

Revenue generated by sin taxes supports many projects imperative in accomplishing social and economic goals. American cities and counties have utilized funds from sin taxes to expand infrastructure, while in Sweden the tax for gambling is used for helping people with gambling problems. Acceptance of sumptuary taxes may be greater than income tax or sales tax.

Support
Proponents argue that the consumption of tobacco and alcohol, the behaviors associated with consumption, or both consumption and the behaviors of consumption, are immoral or "sinful", hence the label "sin tax". For example, Mayo Clinic anesthesiologists Dr. Michael Joyner and Dr. David Warner support increasing taxes on tobacco and alcohol, with the goal of using tax codes to help change behavior and improve health.
Tobacco and alcohol consumption has been linked to a variety of medical problems. In the United States alone, over 440,000 annual deaths are considered to be related to smoking tobacco. A synthesis of 67 studies found that there was evidence indicating tobacco taxation is responsible for "reducing smoking behavior among youth, young adults, and persons of low socioeconomic status, compared to the general population," although no evidence was found indicating this was true for long-term smokers or American Indians.
Following the medical argument, consumers of tobacco and alcohol cause a greater financial burden on society by forcing others to pay for medical treatment of conditions stemming from such consumption, especially in most first-world countries with government-funded healthcare.
 The moral, medical and financial arguments are occasionally considered in contemporary news settings.

Opposition
Sin taxes result in the illegal manufacture, smuggling and/or outright theft of the taxed products, sometimes for personal use but often for sale on the black market.
Critics of sin tax argue that it is a regressive tax in nature and discriminates against the lower classes. Sin taxes are often assessed at a flat rate meaning they account for a much larger portion of the price of an otherwise inexpensive product compared to high-end brands more likely to be purchased by the wealthy. Also, sin tax rates products such as alcohol or cigarettes typically do not account for ability to pay, therefore poor people pay a much greater share of their income as tax.
Sin taxes fail to affect consumers' behaviors in the way that tax proponents suggest, for instance increasing smokers' propensity to smoke high-tar, high-nicotine cigarettes when the per-pack price is raised and increasing the rate of people mixing their own drinks rather than buying pre-mix alcoholic spirits.
The government may become reliant on the revenue from the tax and have to encourage "sinful" behavior in order to maintain the revenue stream.
Taxes collected this way often don't go to the promised programs or often to self-defeating programs. For example, many cities increase the tax on cigarettes and claim it will go towards stop smoking campaigns.

See also
 Consumption tax
 Ecotax
 Land value tax
 Meat tax
 Müskirat resmi
 Paternalism
 Pigovian tax
 Sugary drink tax
 Taxation and regulation of alcohol production
 Tobacco tax

References 

Personal taxes
Tax terms